The Eparchy of Palai is a Syro-Malabar Catholic ecclesiastical territory or eparchy of the Catholic Church with an area of 1166 km2 comprising the Meenachil taluk and a few villages of the neighbouring taluks in Kottayam, Ernakulam, and Idukki districts of central Kerala in South India. The faithful of this eparchy, numbering 326,742, belong to the ancient St. Thomas Christian community. The seat of the bishop is the St. Thomas Cathedral based in the town of Palai. The current bishop is Mar Joseph Kallarangatt, serving since March 2004. Mar Jacob Muricken has been auxiliary bishop since 2012.

Pope Pius XII established the eparchy bifurcating then Eparchy of Changanacherry, and out of the territory covered by the then foranes of Palai, Muttuchira, Kuravilangad, Anakkallu and Ramapuram on 25 July 1950.  Initially, the eparchy was erected as a suffragan of the Acheparchy of Ernakulam. The then apostolic nuncio to India, Archbishop Leo P. Kierkels, installed Mar Sebastian Vayalil as the first bishop of the new eparchy. Eparchy of Changanacherry was elevated to the status of Archeparchy and constituted the new ecclesiastical province of Changanacherry on 22 August 1956. Thus, the eparchy of Palai became one of its suffragans.

History 

Pope Pius XII, by the Bull "Quo Ecclesiarum", issued on 25 July 1950, bifurcated the eparchy of Changanacherry and out of the territory covered by the then Foranes of Palai, Muttuchira, Kuravilangad, Anakkallu and Ramapuram erected the eparchy of Palai as a suffragan of the Archeparchy of Ernakulam. Leo P. Kierkels, the Apostolic Internuncio in India, published the Bull in the St. Thomas Cathedral Palai on 4 January 1951 and installed Sebastian Vayalil as the first bishop of the new eparchy. On 22 August 1956 when the Holy See by the Ap. Const. ‘Regnum Coelorum’ raised the eparchy of Changanacherry to the status of an archeparchy and constituted the new ecclesiastical province of Changanacherry, the eparchy of Palai became one of its suffragans. Joseph Kallarangatt is the current bishop of the eparchy.

Jacob Muricken was appointed as auxiliary bishop in 2012. In 2022, he received approval from Synod of Syro-Malabar Bishops to leave the position of auxiliary bishop and live as a hermit.

Mar Joseph Kallarangatt 
Joseph Kallarangatt, the third bishop of the Eparchy of Palai since 2004, was born on 27 January 1956 at Kayyoor. As the delegate of Syro-Malabar Synod, he attended XIV Ordinary General Assembly of the Synod of Bishops on Family held at Rome from 04-25 October 2015.

Saints and causes for canonisation 
Alphonsa of the Immaculate Conception
Thevarparambil Kunjachan (born Augustine)
Mathew Kadalikkattil
Paremmakkal Thoma Kathanar (1736–1799)

References

External links
 Pala Eparchy
 Eparchy of Palai
 Profile of the Eparchy of Palai

Syro-Malabar Catholic Archeparchy of Changanassery
Syro-Malabar Catholic dioceses
Christian organizations established in 1950
Roman Catholic dioceses and prelatures established in the 20th century
Dioceses in Kerala
1950 establishments in India
Pala, Kerala